Charles Hallam (17 January 1902 – 20 March 1970) was an English footballer who played in the Football League for Crystal Palace, Port Vale and Stoke.

Career
Hallam played for Sandford Hill Primitives, before joining Port Vale in September 1922. His only appearance was at inside-left in a goalless draw with Rotherham County at The Old Recreation Ground on 25 November 1922. He was released in August 1923 and moved on to Sandbach Ramblers. Hallam then joined Stoke in September 1924 and played 19 Second Division games in 1924–25, scoring twice against Blackpool and Stockport County. He played six times in each of the next two seasons and helped Stoke to win the Third Division North title in 1926–27. He then moved on to Crystal Palace in June 1927. He scored in both of his two appearances for the club, and later played for non-league sides Stafford Rangers and Hednesford Town.

Career statistics
Source:

Honours
Stoke City
Football League Third Division North: 1926–27

References

1902 births
1970 deaths
People from Longton, Staffordshire
Footballers from Stoke-on-Trent
English footballers
Association football forwards
Port Vale F.C. players
Sandbach Ramblers F.C. players
Stoke City F.C. players
Crystal Palace F.C. players
Stafford Rangers F.C. players
Hednesford Town F.C. players
English Football League players